Farinu-ye Bala (also Romanized as Farīnū-ye Bālā) is a village in Kharturan Rural District, Beyarjomand District, Shahrud County, Semnan Province, Iran. At the 2006 census, its population was 89, in 23 families.

References 

Populated places in Shahrud County